('four-leaf clover') is a Czech comic book series continuously published since 15 May 1969 created by Jaroslav Němeček. In the 1980s an average edition contained about 220 000 prints and became one of the most popular comic books for children.

Author
Čtyřlístek was created by Jaroslav Němeček born in 1944 in Prague. He is an illustrator and he is accountable for multiple Czech comics, between the most famous ones you may find Čaroděj Huriáš (wizard Huriáš) and Rexík. He also worked for a children magazine called .

History
In 1969 Jaroslav Němeček and his wife created the cartoon series we know today. It was created at their cottage in Doksy. The first comic named Inventions of profesor Myšpulín had 30 000 prints and sold out, motivating them to continue with the comic and create additional episodes. From the seventh episode they started writing also with Ljuba Štíplová. The numbers of prints rapidly increased, going up to 220 000. From 1990 the comic started working with multiple authors. In 2015 the 600th edition was printed, and at the beginning of 2019 the comic celebrated 50 years in print.

Plot
The comic has five main characters - Myšpulín, a geeky cat; Bobík, a tough pig; Fifinka, a pretty dog, Pinďa, a silly rabbit, and Myska, an assistant mouse. They live in the same house in the small fictitious village of Třeskoprsky, somewhere near Podbezdězí. Nearby where the author had his cottage.

Characters

Myšpulín 
Myšpulín, a black and white catboy, dons a red jacket, blue striped trousers, a purple bow tie, and black and white shoes.
He's a genius inventor, creates inventions like time machines, self-driving autonomous vehicles, and robots. He is very clever, calm and innovative. His hobbies include spending time in nature, going on adventures with his friends, and inventing. He enjoys eating food prepared by Fifi.

Bobík 
Bobík the pig typically wears a green shirt and yellow trousers. He is fearless and quick-tempered. He is characterized by his strength and appetite. His hobbies are sports, food and working out. His favorite foods are cake from Fifi, sausages, and anything in plentiful supply. He can also drive a car and sing.

Fifinka 
Fifinka is a white dog that wears a pink-purple dress with lace and red shoes. She is courageous and sacrificing. She is characterized by her caring and friendly personality. She loves cooking. Her hobbies are taking care of the house, gardening and adventurous. Since she was a child she enjoyed bows and boyish mischief.

Pinďa 
Pinďa is a hare. He wears red trousers with just one suspender. He is very friendly and warmhearted. He is characterized by being quite and shy. He enjoys all kinds of sports and reading detective books. He likes eating everything that Fifi cooks for them. He also is a winner of multiple athletic races.

Myska 
Myska is a mouse. He is Myspulin's assistant. He rarely join as a troop and likes to help Myspulin.

Franchise 
A short film series is released in 1990 by Bratri v Triku and Kratky Film Prague. It was still shown on Decko.

A video game entitled Čtyřlístek a strašidelný hrad was released in 2002.

An animated film, was released in 2013 followed by 2019 film.

References

External links
 

Czech comics
1969 comics debuts
Comics characters introduced in 1969
Fictional Czech people
Fictional cats
Comics about cats
Fictional pigs
Fictional dogs
Fictional rabbits and hares
Czech comics characters
Comics about animals
Male characters in comics
Comics adapted into animated films